The Southeast Division is one of the three divisions in the Eastern Conference of the National Basketball Association (NBA). The division consists of five teams, the Atlanta Hawks, the Charlotte Hornets, the Miami Heat, the Orlando Magic and the Washington Wizards.

The division was created at the start of the 2004–05 season, when the league expanded from 29 to 30 teams with the addition of the Charlotte Bobcats. The league realigned itself into three divisions in each conference. The Southeast Division began with five inaugural members, the Hawks, the Bobcats, the Heat, the Magic and the Wizards. The Hawks joined from the Central Division, while the Heat, the Magic and the Wizards joined from the Atlantic Division. The Bobcats changed their name to the Hornets effective with the 2014–15 season, after which it assumed the history of the original Hornets from 1988–2002. The Hornets name was previously used by the now-New Orleans Pelicans from 2002–2013.

The Heat have won the most Southeast Division titles with 11, while the Magic have won four, the Hawks have won two and the Wizards have won one. The Heat won the Southeast Division in four consecutive seasons from 2011 to 2014, a record to this day. Miami's three championships (2006, 2012, and 2013) each came after winning the Southeast Division. The current division champions are the Miami Heat. From 2004 through 2014, Florida's two state-based franchises, Miami and Orlando, won a combined ten straight division championships, a streak that was finally broken after Atlanta won with 60 wins in the 2015 season. Twice, in 2010 and 2014, four of five teams in the division made up half of the eight playoff teams in the postseasons of those two years.

Since the 2021–22 season, the Southeast Division champions has received the Earl Lloyd Trophy, named after Hall of Famer Earl Lloyd.

Current standings

Teams

Notes
 denotes an expansion team.

Earl Lloyd Trophy
Beginning with the 2021–22 season, the Southeast Division champions has received the Earl Lloyd Trophy. As with the other division championship trophies, it is named after one of the African American pioneers from NBA history. Earl Lloyd became the first African American to play in an NBA game, debuting for the Washington Capitols on October 31, 1950. The Lloyd Trophy consists of a  crystal ball.

Division champions

Titles by team

Season results

Notes
 Because of a lockout, the season did not start until December 25, 2011, and all 30 teams played a shortened 66-game regular season schedule.

Rivalries

References
General

Specific

External links
NBA.com Team Index

Eastern Conference (NBA)
National Basketball Association divisions
Atlanta Hawks
Charlotte Hornets
Miami Heat
Orlando Magic
Washington Wizards
NBA
NBA